Yvan Bordeleau (born February 19, 1942 in La Sarre) was the Member of the National Assembly (MNA) Quebec, Canada, for the Montreal provincial electoral district of Acadie from 1989 to 2007.

Bordeleau holds a doctoral degree in psychology from the Université de Montréal and is a former university professor. Bordeleau held the riding of Acadie as a member of the Quebec Liberal Party (QLP) from the 1989 election on September 25, 1989. He was re-elected in the subsequent elections of 1994, 1998, and 2003. Bordeleau served as the parliamentary assistant to the Minister of Education, Jean-Marc Fournier, a position he held from March 2, 2005. Before holding this position he was the parliamentary assistant to the Deputy Premier Monique Gagnon-Tremblay from May 23, 2003 to March 2, 2005.

On January 15, 2007, Bordeleau announced that he would not solicit a fifth mandate as MNA for Acadie.

Electoral record (incomplete)

See also 
Politics of Quebec
Quebec general elections
Quebec Liberal Party

External links 
 

1942 births
Living people
People from Abitibi-Témiscamingue
Politicians from Montreal
Quebec Liberal Party MNAs
Université de Montréal alumni
21st-century Canadian politicians